Shannon Grey Ritch (born September 27, 1970) is an American professional mixed martial artist, boxer, grappler, professional wrestler and kickboxer. In mixed martial arts competition he is the former King of the Cage Middleweight Champion and the inaugural BKFC International Heavyweight Champion in bare-knuckle boxing. A professional competitor since 1998, Ritch has competed for M-1 Global, Combate Americas, MFC, Shark Fights, Pancrase, Battlarts, K-1, Bare Knuckle Fighting Championship, PRIDE, Rebel Fighting Championship, New Japan Pro-Wrestling, King of the Cage, Gladiator Challenge, Hart Legacy Wrestling and the WEC.

Background
Ritch was born in Coolidge, Arizona and was raised "dirt poor" on a farm in Randolph. Ritch began learning karate from a young age and also competed in high school wrestling before becoming a professional kickboxer beginning as an amateur sometime in 1988. Ritch attended Central Arizona College and Arizona State University. Shannon also had a brief stint enlisted in the US Army with the 4th Infantry Regiment, later ending in 1996 before being employed by the private military organization Blackwater. With Blackwater, he was deployed to Kuwait, Iraq and Afghanistan which served as a launch pad for his training in Brazilian jiu-jitsu and later transition to a career in professional mixed martial arts. Shannon started training Brazilian jiu-jitsu in 1996 and received his black belt in 2007 under Dan G. at the Machado Jiu-Jitsu Academy in Dallas, Texas. Ritch still trains military personnel in mixed martial arts and is a mainstay at the Marine Corps Air Station Yuma. At one time Shannon was a bodyguard for United States Congressman John Negroponte while serving as a private contractor under Blackwater.

Mixed martial arts career

Early career 
Ritch made his debut in 1991 at an event in Mexico, but like much of his fighting career this was during a time when sanctioned fights took place under athletic commissions that kept no record of mixed martial arts competitions. Ritch's officially documented professional debut was in 1998. Shannon's full record has over 200 professional MMA fights with 124 wins, 92 losses and 2 draws (4 NC's), some fights going undocumented and dating back as far as 1991, his documented record of fights goes back to 1998 with a record of 58 wins and 89 losses (4 NC's).

PRIDE 
Ritch compiled a record of 13-16 (1) with notable wins in the Super Brawl promotion in Hawaii and single night tournaments in Texas before being signed by the PRIDE Fighting Championships in Japan. He made his debut in the organization on October 31, 2000, at PRIDE 11 against the legendary Japanese fighter Kazushi Sakuraba. Ritch lost via achilles lock submission at 1:08 into the fight.

After impressing PRIDE brass with his showmanship, Ritch made his next appearance for the organization at PRIDE The Best Vol. 2 on July 20, 2002, against A-class shootist, Daisuke Nakamura and lost via armbar submission in the first round.

Pancrase 
In 2004 Shannon drew interest from Pancrase after his wins over The Ultimate Fighter cast members Ray Elbe and Eddy Ellis that same year, his Pancrase debut would be against PRIDE and UFC veteran Yuki Kondo at Pancrase: Brave 6 in a losing effort. He would later take on professional wrestler and MMA journeyman Hikaru Sato at Pancrase 269, their inaugural event on UFC Fight Pass, in 2015 losing the fight. Despite these loses Ritch maintains a partnership with Pancrase occasionally appearing at the Pancrase Gym in Japan to host training seminars and even appearing in the Pancrase energy drink line.

King of the Cage
Ritch holds a record of 2–14 in 16 fights for King of the Cage and despite his record within the promotion he is a former KOTC Middleweight Champion after defeating Canadian veteran Elmer Waterhen via submission in the first round, making his third title defense before dropping the title to Ritch, Shannon later lost the title to Garrett Davis.

Gender Wars MMA 
In 2018 Shannon took part in an event promoted by former UFC fighter Brad Kohler, taking place in Russia with no audience and no ring or cage. The card featured a main event with a woman taking on a man in a mixed martial arts exhibition fight and the winner supposedly taking a US$1 million purse. Ritch opened the card in a heavyweight bout against professional wrestler Jerry "J-Rocc" Mires, making his mixed martial arts debut, Ritch won the fight in the first round after quickly taking Mires down and submitting him with a straight armbar.

Diamond World Fights 
On October 5, 2018, Ritch was to fight in the main event of DWF: MMA Mega Showdown in Delaware against professional wrestler Michael Youngblood, who briefly competed for the WWE and held a 1-0 pro record after beginning his mixed martial arts career earlier in the year, for the DWF Heavyweight Championship and co-headlined by former UFC contender Mike Bronzoulis against veteran Marcus Gaines who is also an occasional training partner with Shannon. After the fighters who were set to compete on the card had conducted the pre fight press conference and weigh-ins to promote the event were later informed as the main card was set to begin that the promoters who made an investment for the card to take place did not have enough funds to pay the fighters and staff and that an announcement would be made to the attendance that their tickets would have to be refunded. The promoter behind the DWF organization, Gail Stallings-Minor who purportedly was the first African-American woman to promote a mixed martial arts event, left the venue after learning the fighters had to be told they would not be paid and that state police had arrived. Bellator MMA Women's Flyweight Champion Ilima-Lei Macfarlane, who was cornering a fighter on the card, later described the venue as "complete chaos" after watching the promoters rush to flee the scene as police began to enter.

Road to ONE: RUF Nation 

Ritch is scheduled to face fellow mixed martial arts veteran Aaron Brink in the main event of Road to ONE: RUF 44 on October 23, 2021, the event is a cross promotion between RUF and ONE Championship. However, Brink later withdrew from the fight and was replaced by Samson Guerrero. Ritch won by submission via rear-naked choke.

Grappling 
Shannon has found success as a grappler winning multiple NAGA, Grapplers Quest and IBJJF competitions, most recently winning a gold medal in the heavyweight division at the UAEJJF Pro Jiu-Jitsu Championships '17 in Phoenix, Arizona, a gold medal at the Grand Canyon 2017 BJJ Open in the super heavyweight division, 2 gold medals in Gi and No-Gi heavyweight masters division at the 2017 SJJIF World's in Long Beach and a silver medal at the '17 Arizona State BJJ Championships. Ritch has notable bouts in submission grappling against Rodrigo Gracie at a NAGA/Gracie Academy hosted event in 2007, Ben Askren at the 2009 FILA USA World's, Ron Keslar at the SJJIF 2017 Worlds, Robert Drysdale black belt and QUINTET competitor Marcelo Nunes at Submission Hunter Pro 22 that ended in a draw and Jeff Monson in a 2016 no-gi bout that took place in Russia.

Bare-knuckle boxing 
Ritch began his bare-knuckle boxing career in the mid-1990s competing in an arena known as the Plaza del Toro in Nogales, Sonora, Mexico. Ritch currently holds a 26–3 record in bare-knuckle boxing with all of his wins coming by way of knockout, and ranked as the #8 heavyweight bare knuckle fighter in the world as of 2019. In 2016 Shannon was to fight against boxing superstar Bobby Gunn for the coveted Police Gazette Diamond Heavyweight Championship and the winner receiving a $100,000 win bonus, the bout never materialized.

BKB
Shannon later had a bare knuckle fight in 2018 for the BKB promotion in the UK against Canadian fighter Jack Draper at BKB 6 hosted at the O2 Arena, losing in the second round after a controversial TKO.

Bare Knuckle Fighting Championship
Ritch is set to fight again in bare-knuckle boxing in 2019 for the Bare Knuckle Fighting Championships at BKFC 4 against Omar Molina in Cancun, Mexico, Shannon would go on to win the fight via knockout in 26 seconds of round 1.

Professional wrestling career

Battlarts
Ritch made his pro wrestling debut in October 2001 for the Battlarts promotion against UWFi veteran Daijiro Matsui at the event Battlarts Yuki-Bom-Be-Ye ‘01 losing via pinfall.

New Japan Pro Wrestling
In 2003 Ritch was signed to a one year developmental contract with New Japan Pro Wrestling and had one match against Rocky Romero that ended in a double count out after both wrestlers brawled outside the ring past the time limit given by the referee.

WrestleFanFest
Shannon took part in the “Night of Indy’s” battle royal match in 2007 at the WrestleFanFest Malice in the Palace event in Daly City, California, the event was slated to also feature mixed martial arts fights and took place at the Cow Palace a venue known for hosting MMA events. He would go on to win the match after eliminating the final two opponents in the 20-man battle royal, Timothy Thatcher and former WWE Cruiserweight Champion Chavo Classic.

Championship Wrestling from Hollywood
Shannon signed a one match deal with Championship Wrestling from Hollywood in their 2018 event in China to appear on the undercard against Wenbo Liu in a rematch from a 2017 MMA fight, Ritch would go on to lose this match via disqualification after he brought a steel chair into the ring.

Hart Legacy Wrestling (2020-present)
In 2020 Shannon announced his return to pro wrestling and that he was signed to appear in a 2-month tour with Canadian promotion HLW. He made his debut in a match against The New Hart Foundation member Kenny Lester on February 20 in Wabasca, Alberta, Canada and won via pinfall after a distraction from Ken Shamrock.

On March 26, 2022, Ritch returned to HLW in their debut live event on FITE TV in Elmira, New York and won the HLW Showdown Championship after defeating TJ Epixx by submission with an ankle lock.

Acting 
Ritch has been featured in two episodes of Walker, Texas Ranger as a Biker Gang Member and a character named Knight, Choke in 2011 as an extra, CSI Las Vegas as Thug #2, CSI: Crime Scene Investigation as Cage Fighter #1, an episode of iCarly as a MMA Fighter, an episode of Numbers in 2010, an episode of Ultimate Soldier Challenge on the History Channel representing a military contracting company and most recently in 2017 the direct to DVD film, directed by Robert Parham and Warren Foster, Bullets, Blades and Blood and upcoming in 2018 No Way Out directed by Jeffrey D. Parker, distributed by New Vision Films. In 2017 Shannon started filming of a biopic centered around his mixed martial arts career, through HBO films, titled The Real Last Samurai and to be released exclusively on HBO in late 2019. In 2021 Shannon will be co-starring alongside Mickey Rourke and Donald Cerrone in The Commando.

Golfing 
Ritch is also an avid golf player, winning 1st place in many state and pro am competitions held within his native Arizona as recent as 2017. Shannon won 2 Veterans Golfing Association 1st place medals in 2018 and again in 2019, the tournament is hosted by the United States Golf Association.

Lethwei 
In July 2001, Ritch was invited to compete under Lethwei rules at the "International Myanmar traditional boxing challenge & Myanmar-Australia talent testing boxing competition" in Yangon, Myanmar. Ritch was matched against the Burmese fighter Ei Htee Kaw. Ritch started the fight strong and forced his opponent to be defensive. At one point, Ei Htee Kaw turned away and raised his knee in defence, pointing his knee forward. Ritch struck himself on Ei Htee Kaw's knee unintentionally, driving it directly into his solar plexus. Ritch went down immediately without Ei Htee Kaw throwing a shot. He couldn't breathe and the fight was over.

Lethwei record 

|-  bgcolor="#FFBBBB"
| 2001-06-09 || Loss || align="left" | Ei Htee Kaw || International Challenge Fights, Thuwunna NIS(1) || Yangon, Myanmar || TKO || 1 ||
|-
| colspan=9 | Legend:

Kickboxing record

|-  style="background:#fbb;"
| 2002-08-17 || Loss ||align=left| Brian Schwartz || K-1 World Grand Prix 2002 in Las Vegas || Las Vegas, Nevada, USA || KO || 2 || 1:40
|-  style="background:#fbb;"
| 2001-08-11 || Loss ||align=left| Frank Shamrock || K-1 World Grand Prix 2001 in Las Vegas || Las Vegas, Nevada, USA || TKO (broken arm) || 1 || 0:53
|-
| colspan=9 | Legend:

Mixed martial arts record

|-
| Loss
| align=center|58–89 (4)
| Glenn Sparv
| Submission (calf slicer)
| REBEL FC X: A New Order 
| 
| align=center|1
| align=center|1:31
| Moscow, Russia 
|
|-
| Loss
| align=center|58–88 (4)
| Simon Carson
| TKO (knees and punches) 
| Battlefield FC 2 
| 
| align=center|1
| align=center|3:34
| Macau 
|
|-
|-
| Win
| align=center|58–87 (4)
| Manuel Chacon Camarena
| TKO (punches)
| Imperio MMA: Rocky Point Beach Bash 
| 
| align=center|1
| align=center|0:36
| Puerto Penasco, Sonora, Mexico
|
|-
|-
| Loss
| align=center|57–87 (4)
| Travis Fulton
| Submission (forearm choke)
| M-1 Global: Road to M-1 USA 2
| 
| align=center|2
| align=center|0:41
| Winterhaven, California, United States
|
|-
|-
| Win
| align=center|57–86 (4)
| Eriko Vasquez
| Submission (heel hook)
| Imperio MMA 8: Honor and Glory
| 
| align=center|2
| align=center|0:38
| Tampico, Tamaulipas, Mexico
|
|-
| Loss
| align=center|56-86 (4)
| Wenbo Liu
| TKO (punches)
| REBEL FC 6: China vs. The World
| 
| align=center| 1
| align=center| 4:18
| Shenzhen, China
|
|-
| Win
| align=center|56–85 (4)
| Omar Jimenez
| KO (head kick)
| Imperio MMA 7
| 
| align=center|2
| align=center|3:15
| Tijuana, Mexico
|
|-
| Loss
| align=center|55–85 (4)
| Samson Guerrero
| Verbal Submission (punches)
| World Fighting Federation 34
| 
| align=center|2
| align=center|0:41
| Chandler, Arizona, United States
|
|-
| Loss
| align=center|55–84 (4)
| Josh Appelt
| TKO (punches)
| Gladiator Challenge: Contenders
| 
| align=center|1
| align=center|1:08
| Lincoln, California, United States
|
|-
| Loss
| align=center|55–83 (4)
| Vitaly Shemetov
| KO (punches)
| The Legend King Championship 2
| 
| align=center|1
| align=center|2:53
| Zhuhai, China
|
|-
| Loss
| align=center|55–82 (4)
| Tony Lopez
| Submission (guillotine choke)
| Combate Americas 6
| 
| align=center|1
| align=center|1:45
| Los Angeles, California, United States
|
|-
| Win
| align=center| 55–81 (4)
| Alejandro Baez
| Submission (heel hook)
| Imperio MMA: Spring Break Brawl
| 
| align=center| 1
| align=center| 4:20
| Tijuana, Mexico
|
|-
| Win
| align=center| 54–81 (4)
| Mavrick Harvey
| Submission (rear-naked choke)
| UR Fight 1
| 
| align=center| 1
| align=center| 1:32
| Phoenix, Arizona, United States
|
|-
| Loss
| align=center| 53–81 (4)
| Diego Herzog
| TKO (punches)
| IFC 35: California Caged Combat
| 
| align=center| 1
| align=center| 0:44
| Brooks, California, United States
|
|-
| Loss
| align=center| 53–79 (4)
| Hikaru Sato
| Submission (armbar)
| Pancrase: 269
| 
| align=center| 1
| align=center| 1:36
| Tokyo, Japan
|
|-
| Loss
| align=center| 53–78 (4)
| Shonie Carter
| TKO (injury)
| Super Brawl Showdown 1
| 
| align=center| 1
| align=center| 5:00
| Phoenix, Arizona, United States
|
|-
| Win
| align=center| 53–77 (4)
| Roman Sierra
| Submission (rear-naked choke)
| Imperio MMA
| 
| align=center| 1
| align=center| 1:42
| Tampico, Mexico
| 
|-
| Win
| align=center| 52–77 (4)
| Darren McNamee
| Submission (can opener)
| IFC MMA: USA vs. UK
| 
| align=center| 1
| align=center| 1:08
| Hampshire, England
| 
|-
| Loss
| align=center| 51–77 (4)
| Leeroy Fornoff
| TKO (punches)
| Rage in the Cage 164
| 
| align=center| 1
| align=center| 2:55
| Chandler, Arizona, United States
| 
|-
| Win
| align=center| 51–76 (4)
| Duncan Wilson
| Submission (rear-naked choke)
| Fivestar Fight League 2: Origins
| 
| align=center| 1
| align=center| 0:20
| Prince George, British Columbia, Canada
| 
|-
| Win
| align=center| 50–76 (4)
| Ivan Guillen
| Submission (rear-naked choke)
| Mexico Fighter 4
| 
| align=center| 1
| align=center| 0:59
| Sonora, Mexico
| 
|-
| Win
| align=center| 49–76 (4)
| Rudy Aguilar
| TKO (punches)
| Rage In The Cage 160
| 
| align=center| 1
| align=center| 1:04
| Chandler, Arizona, United States
| 
|-
| Loss
| align=center| 48–76 (4)
| Joe Riggs
| TKO (punches)
| Duel for Domination: Extravaganza
| 
| align=center| 1
| align=center| 0:56
| Phoenix, Arizona, United States
| 
|-
| Loss
| align=center| 48–75 (4)
| Joe Cronin 
| TKO (punches)
| Rage In The Cage 156
| 
| align=center| 2
| align=center| 1:24
| Chandler, Arizona, United States
| 
|-
| Win
| align=center| 48–74 (4)
| Scott Guenther 
| KO (punch)
| Rage In The Cage 148
| 
| align=center| 1
| align=center| 0:20
| Chandler, Arizona, United States
|
|-
| Win
| align=center| 47–74 (4)
| Chuy Torres 
| Submission (heel hook)
| Combate Extremo: Ritch vs. Torres
| 
| align=center| 1
| align=center| N/A
| Monterrey, Nuevo Leon, Mexico
| 
|-
| Win
| align=center| 46–74 (4)
| Richard Frye 
| Submission (armbar)
| Rage In The Cage 147
| 
| align=center| 1
| align=center| 1:45
| Phoenix, Arizona, United States
| 
|-
| Loss
| align=center| 45–74 (4)
| Cody Krahn 
| TKO (groin injury)
| KOTC 48
| 
| align=center| 1
| align=center| 2:35
| Edmonton, Alberta, Canada
| 
|-
| Loss
| align=center| 45–73 (4)
| Ray Elbe
| Technical Submission (triangle choke)
| Martial Combat 11
| 
| align=center| 1
| align=center| 0:57
| Sentosa, Singapore
| 
|-
| Loss
| align=center| 45–72 (4)
| Chris Kizuik
| TKO (punches)
| KOTC: Sentinel
| 
| align=center| 1
| align=center| 2:52
| Cold Lake, Alberta, Canada
|
|-
| Loss
| align=center| 45–71 (4)
| Mike Moritz
| Submission (punches)
| Rage In The Cage 143
| 
| align=center| 1
| align=center| 2:38
| Phoenix, Arizona, United States
| 
|-
| Loss
| align=center| 45–70 (4)
| Garrett Davis
| TKO (punches)
| KOTC: Combustion
| 
| align=center| 1
| align=center| 3:17
| Edmonton, Alberta, Canada
|
|-
| Loss
| align=center| 45–69 (4)
| Bill Mahood
| Submission (punches)
| KOTC: Fearless
| 
| align=center| 1
| align=center| 1:00
| Penticton, British Columbia, Canada
|
|-
| Loss
| align=center| 45–68 (4)
| Antonio Zamora
| Submission (rear-naked choke)
| New Mexico Cage Fighting
| 
| align=center| 1
| align=center| 1:17
| Albuquerque, New Mexico, United States
| 
|-
| Loss
| align=center| 45–67 (4)
| Jared Brussemakers
| KO (elbow)
| KOTC: Thunderstruck 2
| 
| align=center| 1
| align=center| 2:09
| Calgary, Alberta, Canada
|Non-title bout.
|-
| Win
| align=center| 45–66 (4)
| Elmer Waterhen
| Submission (toe hold)
| KOTC: Nailbiter
| 
| align=center| 1
| align=center| 0:54
| Edmonton, Alberta, Canada
|
|-
| Win
| align=center| 44–66 (4)
| Marcus Gaines
| Submission (armbar)
| National Cage Fighting
| 
| align=center| 1
| align=center| 0:43
| Tucson, Arizona, United States
| 
|-
| Loss
| align=center| 43–66 (4)
| Jose Landi-Jons
| KO (punches)
| Shark Fights 5.5: Nothing To Lose
| 
| align=center| 1
| align=center| 0:08
| Edmonton, Alberta, Canada
| 
|-
| Loss
| align=center| 43–65 (4)
| Joey Rivera
| Submission (injury)
| KOTC: Legends
| 
| align=center| 1
| align=center| 1:17
| Winterhaven, California, United States
| 
|-
| Loss
| align=center| 43–64 (4)
| TJ Waldburger
| Submission (armbar)
| Shark Fights 4
| 
| align=center| 1
| align=center| 1:37
| Lubbock, Texas, United States
| 
|-
| Loss
| align=center| 43–63 (4)
| Eric Davila
| Submission (kimura)
| Shark Fights 3
| 
| align=center| 1
| align=center| 1:15
| Amarillo, Texas, United States
| 
|-
| Win
| align=center| 43–62 (4)
| John Wood
| KO (head kick)
| Shark Fights 2
| 
| align=center| 1
| align=center| 0:15
| Amarillo, Texas, United States
| 
|-
| Win
| align=center| 42–62 (4)
| John Wood
| Submission (heel hook)
| Shark Fights 1
| 
| align=center| 1
| align=center| 0:47
| Amarillo, Texas, United States
| 
|-
| Win
| align=center| 41–62 (4)
| Danny Bennett
| Submission (armbar)
| CageSport MMA
| 
| align=center| 1
| align=center| 0:37
| Tacoma, Washington, United States
| 
|-
| Win
| align=center| 40–62 (4)
| Joe Vigil
| Submission (rear-naked choke)
| XP3: The Proving Ground
| 
| align=center| 1
| align=center| 1:00
| Houston, Texas, United States
| 
|-
| Loss
| align=center| 39–62 (4)
| Todd Medina
| Submission (rear-naked choke)
| Strike FC: Night of Gladiators
| 
| align=center| 1
| align=center| 4:56
| Ploieti, Romania
| 
|-
| Win
| align=center| 39–61 (4)
| Jasper Lockett
| Submission (triangle choke)
| CCCF: Battle on the Border
| 
| align=center| 1
| align=center| 1:02
| Newkirk, Oklahoma, United States
| 
|-
|  NC
| align=center| 38–61 (4)
| Brian Ebersole
| No Contest
| Malice at Cow Palace
| 
| align=center| 1
| align=center| 3:46
| San Francisco, California, United States
| Overturned by CSAC.
|-
| Win
| align=center| 38–61 (3)
| Vincent Perez
| Submission (armbar)
| Valor Fighting: 4th and B
| 
| align=center| 1
| align=center| 0:49
| San Diego, California, United States
| 
|-
| Win
| align=center| 37–61 (3)
| Vincent Perez
| Submission (armbar)
| War Zone 1
| 
| align=center| 1
| align=center| 1:47
| Houston, Texas, United States
| 
|-
| Loss
| align=center| 36–61 (3)
| Garret Davis
| Submission (rear-naked choke)
| KOTC: Widowmaker
| 
| align=center| 1
| align=center| N/A
| Edmonton, Alberta, Canada
| 
|-
| Loss
| align=center| 36–60 (3)
| Maverick Harvey
| TKO (knee)
| Valor Fighting: Showdown at 4th and B
| 
| align=center| 1
| align=center| 1:42
| San Diego, California, United States
| 
|-
| Loss
| align=center| 36–59 (3)
| Andy Maccarone
| Submission (punches)
| KOTC: Heavy Hitters
| 
| align=center| 1
| align=center| 2:28
| California, United States
| 
|-
| Loss
| align=center| 36–58 (3)
| Sammy Morgan
| Submission (toe hold)
| KOTC: The Return
| 
| align=center| 1
| align=center| 1:29
| San Jacinto, California, United States
| 
|-
| Loss
| align=center| 36–57 (3)
| Brock Larson
| TKO (punches)
| Extreme Challenge 66
| 
| align=center| 1
| align=center| 1:16
| Medina, Minnesota, United States
| 
|-
| Loss
| align=center| 36–56 (3)
| Chris Brennan
| Submission
| RM 7: Championship Night
| 
| align=center| 1
| align=center| N/A
| Tijuana, Mexico
| 
|-
| Loss
| align=center| 36–55 (3)
| Maverick Harvey
| TKO (injury)
| Kage Kombat
| 
| align=center| 1
| align=center| N/A
| California, United States
| 
|-
| Loss
| align=center| 36–54 (3)
| Alex Schoenauer
| Submission (guillotine choke)
| SF 13: Rocky Mountain Sportfight
| 
| align=center| 1
| align=center| 0:29
| Denver, Colorado, United States
| 
|-
| Loss
| align=center| 36–53 (3)
| John Alessio
| TKO (punches)
| KOTC 58: Prime Time
| 
| align=center| 1
| align=center| 0:41
| San Jacinto, California, United States
| 
|-
| Loss
| align=center| 36–52 (3)
| Kengo Ura
| Submission (heel hook)
| Valor Fighting: Medford Mayhem
| 
| align=center| 1
| align=center| 1:04
| Medford, Oregon, United States
| 
|-
| Win
| align=center| 36–51 (3)
| Robert Sarkozi
| Disqualification
| KOTC 56: Caliente
| 
| align=center| 1
| align=center| 1:53
| Globe, Arizona, United States
| Illegal strikes
|-
| Loss
| align=center| 35–51 (3)
| Dan Severn
| Submission (chokehold)
| Extreme Wars: X-1
| 
| align=center| 2
| align=center| 1:05
| Honolulu, Hawaii, United States
| 
|-
| Loss
| align=center| 35–50 (3)
| Mario Stapel
| Submission (armlock)
| KOTC 55: Grudge Match
| 
| align=center| 1
| align=center| 4:43
| Albuquerque, New Mexico, United States
| 
|-
| Loss
| align=center| 35–49 (3)
| Dan Severn
| Submission (keylock)
| Northern Fighting Championships
| 
| align=center| 2
| align=center| N/A
| Alaska, United States
| 
|-
| Win
| align=center| 35–48 (3)
| James Murdock
| Submission (heel hook)
| International Extreme Fight Challenge
| 
| align=center| 1
| align=center| 1:26
| Anchorage, Alaska, United States
| 
|-
| Loss
| align=center| 34–48 (3)
| Rich Guerin
| Submission (verbal)
| XFC: Dome of Destruction
| 
| align=center| 1
| align=center| 2:32
| Tacoma, Washington, United States
| 
|-
| Loss
| align=center| 34–47 (3)
| Bradley Glass
| Submission (armbar)
| GLFL: Brawl for All 7
| 
| align=center| 1
| align=center| 3:24
| Centerville, Ohio, United States
| 
|-
| Win
| align=center| 34–46 (3)
| Ron Haskett
| Submission (punches)
| International Extreme Fight Challenge
| 
| align=center| 1
| align=center| 0:26
| Anchorage, Alaska, United States
| 
|-
| Win
| align=center| 33–46 (3)
| Fletcher Siever
| Submission (armbar)
| PNRF: Explosion
| 
| align=center| 1
| align=center| 3:22
| Santa Fe, New Mexico, United States
| 
|-
| Loss
| align=center| 32–46 (3)
| Yuki Kondo
| Submission (kneebar)
| Pancrase: Brave 6
| 
| align=center| 1
| align=center| 1:01
| Tokyo, Japan
| 
|-
| Win
| align=center| 32–45 (3)
| Daryl Guthmiller
| Technical Submission (armbar)
| Extreme Challenge 58
| 
| align=center| 1
| align=center| 1:36
| Medina, Minnesota, United States
| 
|-
| Win
| align=center| 31–45 (3)
| Eddy Ellis
| Submission (armbar)
| Lords of the Cage
| 
| align=center| 1
| align=center| 1:29
| Anacortes, Washington, United States
| 
|-
| Loss
| align=center| 30–45 (3)
| James Fanshier
| Submission (heel hook)
| GC 26 
| 
| align=center| 1
| align=center| 2:34
| Colusa, California, United States
| 
|-
| Win
| align=center| 30–44 (3)
| Stacy Hakes
| KO (kick)
| XCF: Evolution
| 
| align=center| 1
| align=center| 0:11
| Phoenix, Arizona, United States
| 
|-
| Win
| align=center| 29–44 (3)
| Danny Anderson
| Submission (flying armbar)
| EC 57 
| 
| align=center| 1
| align=center| 1:50
| Council Bluffs, Iowa, United States
| 
|-
| Win
| align=center| 28–44 (3)
| Chris Peak
| Submission (heel hook)
| Enter the Beast
| 
| align=center| 1
| align=center| 0:37
| Nanaimo, British Columbia, Canada
| 
|-
| Loss
| align=center| 27–44 (3)
| Hector Ramirez
| KO
| Pit Fighting Championship
| 
| align=center| 1
| align=center| N/A
| Upland, California, United States
| 
|-
| Win
| align=center| 27–43 (3)
| Ray Elbe
| Submission (heel hook)
| King of the Rockies
| 
| align=center| 1
| align=center| 1:10
| Fort Collins, Colorado, United States
| 
|-
| Win
| align=center| 26–43 (3)
| Reggie Cardiel
| Submission (armbar)
| XXXtreme Impact
| 
| align=center| 1
| align=center| 1:23
| Tijuana, Mexico
| 
|-
| Loss
| align=center| 25–43 (3)
| Masanori Suda
| Submission (triangle choke)
| Super Brawl 32
| 
| align=center| 1
| align=center| 1:02
| Honolulu, Hawaii, United States
| 
|-
| Loss
| align=center| 25–42 (3)
| Kyle Brees
| Submission (armbar)
| Xtreme Cage Fighting
| 
| align=center| 1
| align=center| 1:32
| Lake Havasu City, Arizona, United States
| 
|-
| Win
| align=center| 25–41 (3)
| Fernando Rodriguez
| Submission (armbar)
| Ultimate Fighting Mexico
| 
| align=center| 1
| align=center| N/A
| Monterrey, Mexico
| 
|-
| Loss
| align=center| 24–41 (3)
| Steve Headden
| TKO
| ISCF: Trauma
| 
| align=center| 1
| align=center| 1:42
| Dalton, Georgia, United States
| 
|-
| Loss
| align=center| 24–40 (3)
| Ross Ebañez
| TKO (injury)
| ROTR 3: Rumble on the Rock 3
| 
| align=center| 1
| align=center| 5:00
| Hilo, Hawaii, United States
| 
|-
| Win
| align=center| 24–39 (3)
| Robert Maldonado
| Submission (armbar)
| ECS: Evolution
| 
| align=center| 1
| align=center| 0:25
| Phoenix, Arizona, United States
| 
|-
| Win
| align=center| 23–39 (3)
| Matvey Baranov
| TKO (elbows)
| World Absolute Fighting Championship
| 
| align=center| 1
| align=center| 1:32
| Chabarovsk, Russia
| 
|-
| Win
| align=center| 22–39 (3)
| Jafar Sultanaliev
| Submission (armbar)
| World Absolute Fighting Championship
| 
| align=center| 1
| align=center| 0:52
| Chabarovsk, Russia
| 
|-
| Loss
| align=center| 21–39 (3)
| Miguel Gutierrez
| Submission (heel hook)
| Cage Fighting Monterrey
| 
| align=center| 1
| align=center| N/A
| Monterrey, Mexico
| 
|-
| Win
| align=center| 21–38 (3)
| Ruben Escamilla
| Submission (kneebar)
| Showdown at McGee Park
| 
| align=center| 1
| align=center| 0:50
| Farmington, New Mexico, United States
| 
|-
| Win
| align=center| 20–38 (3)
| Eddie Bartot
| Submission (armbar)
| Showdown at McGee Park
| 
| align=center| 1
| align=center| 0:18
| Farmington, New Mexico, United States
| 
|-
|  NC
| align=center| 19–38 (3)
| Renato Verissimo
| No Contest
| Rumble on the Rock 2
| 
| align=center| 1
| align=center| 3:09
| Hilo, Hawaii, United States
|Fight stopped due to illegal headbutt.
|-
| Loss
| align=center| 19–38 (2)
| Evan Tanner
| Submission (triangle choke)
| Fight against Cancer
| 
| align=center| 1
| align=center| N/A
| Portland, Oregon, United States
| 
|-
| Win
| align=center| 19–37 (2)
| David Klein
| KO (kick)
| RITC 44: Feel the Power
| 
| align=center| 1
| align=center| 0:09
| Casa Grande, Arizona, United States
| 
|-
| Loss
| align=center| 18–37 (2)
| Nino Marroquin
| TKO (injury)
| Cage Fighting Monterrey
| 
| align=center| 1
| align=center| N/A
| Monterrey, Mexico
| 
|-
| Loss
| align=center| 18–36 (2)
| Wes Combs
| TKO
| PFC: Super Bash
| 
| align=center| 1
| align=center| N/A
| California, United States
| 
|-
| Win
| align=center| 18–35 (2)
| Kaleo Padilla
| Submission (armbar)
| Rumble on the Rock 1
| 
| align=center| 1
| align=center| 4:20
| Hilo, Hawaii, United States
| 
|-
| Loss
| align=center| 17–35 (2)
| Diego Sanchez
| Submission (rear naked choke)
| KOTC 20: Crossroads
| 
| align=center| 1
| align=center| N/A
| Bernalillo, New Mexico, United States
| 
|-
| Win
| align=center| 17–34 (2)
| Matt Horning
| Submission (heel hook)
| HHCF 4: Thanksgiving Throwdown
| 
| align=center| 1
| align=center| N/A
| Circleville, Ohio, United States
| 
|-
| Win
| align=center| 16–34 (2)
| John Lansing
| Submission (rear-naked choke)
| RITC 40: Casa Grande
| 
| align=center| 1
| align=center| 0:55
| Casa Grande, Arizona, United States
| 
|-
| Loss
| align=center| 15–34 (2)
| Brian Ebersole
| TKO
| Ultimate Fighting Mexico
| 
| align=center| 1
| align=center| 3:40
| Monterrey, Mexico
| 
|-
| Loss
| align=center| 15–33 (2)
| Edwin Dewees
| Submission (armbar)
| RITC 38: Let's Roll
| 
| align=center| 1
| align=center| 1:12
| Phoenix, Arizona, United States
| 
|-
| Loss
| align=center| 15–32 (2)
| Chris Brennan
| Submission (armbar)
| Aztec Challenge 1
| 
| align=center| 1
| align=center| 4:50
| Ciudad Juárez, Mexico
| 
|-
| Win
| align=center| 15–31 (2)
| Jeff Rogers
| TKO (knees)
| RITC 37
| 
| align=center| 1
| align=center| 1:02
| Phoenix, Arizona, United States
| 
|-
| Loss
| align=center| 14–31 (2)
| Daisuke Nakamura
| Submission (reverse armbar)
| PRIDE The Best Vol.2
| 
| align=center| 1
| align=center| 4:28
| Tokyo, Japan
| 
|-
|  NC
| align=center| 14–30 (2)
| Cedric Marks
| No Contest
| World Fighting Championships 1
| 
| align=center| 1
| align=center| N/A
| San Antonio, Texas, United States
| 
|-
| Loss
| align=center| 14–30 (1)
| Joe Merit
| KO (knee)
| KOTC 14: 5150
| 
| align=center| 1
| align=center| 1:46
| Bernalillo, New Mexico, United States
| 
|-
| Loss
| align=center| 14–29 (1)
| Jared Rollins
| Submission
| California Pancration Championships
| 
| align=center| 1
| align=center| 2:33
| Los Angeles, California, United States
| 
|-
| Loss
| align=center| 14–28 (1)
| Sherk Julian
| Submission (punches)
| WEC 3
| 
| align=center| 1
| align=center| 1:57
| Lemoore, California, United States
| 
|-
| Loss
| align=center| 14–27 (1)
| Jason MacDonald
| Submission (rear-naked choke)
| MFC 4: New Groundz
| 
| align=center| 1
| align=center| 2:45
| Calgary, Alberta, Canada
| 
|-
| Loss
| align=center| 14–26 (1)
| Jeremy Williams
| Submission (punch)
| FFC 1 
| 
| align=center| 1
| align=center| 3:00
| Honolulu, Hawaii, United States
| 
|-
| Loss
| align=center| 14–25 (1)
| Benji Radach
| TKO (punches)
| MFC 3: Canadian Pride
| 
| align=center| 1
| align=center| 1:18
| Grande Prairie, Alberta
| 
|-
| Loss
| align=center| 14–24 (1)
| Brian Dunn
| Submission (armbar)
| Rock'n'Rumble 1
| 
| align=center| 1
| align=center| 1:35
| United States
| 
|-
| Loss
| align=center| 14–23 (1)
| Ronald Jhun
| TKO (punches)
| Warriors Quest 3
| 
| align=center| 1
| align=center| 2:17
| Hawaii, United States
| 
|-
| Loss
| align=center| 14–22 (1)
| Henry Matamoros
| Submission (armbar)
| IHC 3: Exodus
| 
| align=center| 1
| align=center| 0:47
| Illinois, United States
| 
|-
| Loss
| align=center| 14–21 (1)
| James Upshur
| Submission (armbar)
| Rage in the Cage 30
| 
| align=center| 1
| align=center| 0:38
| Phoenix, Arizona, United States
| 
|-
| Loss
| align=center| 14–20 (1)
| Mark Weir
| Submission (choke)
| MB 3: Independence Day
| 
| align=center| 1
| align=center| N/A
| England
| 
|-
| Loss
| align=center| 14–19 (1)
| Katsumi Usuta
| Submission (heel hook)
| KOTC 9: Showtime
| 
| align=center| 1
| align=center| 2:20
| San Jacinto, California, United States
| 
|-
| Win
| align=center| 14–18 (1)
| Erik Johnston
| Submission (armbar)
| Total Kombat
| 
| align=center| 1
| align=center| 4:23
| McAllen, Texas, United States
| 
|-
| Loss
| align=center| 13–18 (1)
| John Renken
| Submission (heel hook)
| Bushido 1
| 
| align=center| 1
| align=center| N/A
| Tempe, Arizona, United States
| 
|-
| Loss
| align=center| 13–17 (1)
| Kazushi Sakuraba
| Submission (achilles lock)
| PRIDE 11: Battle of the Rising Sun
| 
| align=center| 1
| align=center| 1:08
| Osaka, Japan
| 
|-
| Loss
| align=center| 13–16 (1)
| Jose Luis Munoz
| TKO
| Vale Tudo Mexico 2
| 
| align=center| 1
| align=center| 1:42
| Mexico
| 
|-
| Loss
| align=center| 13–15 (1)
| Larry Parker
| TKO
| VTM 1: Copa Mexico 2000 Grand Prix
| 
| align=center| 1
| align=center| 0:45
| Nuevo Laredo, Mexico
| 
|-
| Win
| align=center| 13–14 (1)
| Hector Ferreyro
| Submission
| VTM 1: Copa Mexico 2000 Grand Prix
| 
| align=center| 1
| align=center| 0:36
| Nuevo Laredo, Mexico
| 
|-
| Loss
| align=center| 12–14 (1)
| Jake Shields
| Submission (arm triangle choke)
| Best of the Best
| 
| align=center| 1
| align=center| N/A
| Tempe, Arizona, United States
| 
|-
| Win
| align=center| 12–13 (1)
| Luke Pedigo
| Submission (armbar)
| TFC 1: Fightzone 1
| 
| align=center| 1
| align=center| N/A
| Fort Wayne, Indiana, United States
| 
|-
| Loss
| align=center| 11–13 (1)
| Steve Berger
| Submission (guillotine choke)
| Submission Fighting Championship
| 
| align=center| 1
| align=center| 1:30
| Belleville, Illinois, United States
| 
|-
| Loss
| align=center| 11–12 (1)
| Alexandre Ferreira
| Submission (keylock)
| Amsterdam Absolute Championship 2
| 
| align=center| 1
| align=center| 0:48
| Amsterdam, Holland
| 
|-
| Loss
| align=center| 11–11 (1)
| Maurice Wilson
| Submission (guillotine choke)
| Cage Wars 2
| 
| align=center| 1
| align=center| N/A
| Arizona, United States
| 
|-
| Loss
| align=center| 11–10 (1)
| Antonio McKee
| Submission (punches)
| Ready to Rumble
| 
| align=center| 1
| align=center| N/A
| Woodland Hills, California, United States
| 
|-
| Loss
| align=center| 11–9 (1)
| Paul Nixon
| Submission (armbar)
| HOOKnSHOOT: Texas Heat
| 
| align=center| 1
| align=center| 4:17
| Harker Heights, Texas, United States
| 
|-
| Loss
| align=center| 11–8 (1)
| Bob Cook
| Submission (punches)
| Warriors Challenge 5
| 
| align=center| 1
| align=center| N/A
| Fresno, California, United States
| 
|-
| Loss
| align=center| 11–7 (1)
| Yves Edwards
| Submission (rear-naked choke)
| Armageddon 1
| 
| align=center| 1
| align=center| N/A
| Houston, Texas, United States
| 
|-
| Win
| align=center| 11–6 (1)
| David Harris
| Submission (injury)
| Absolute Face Off
| 
| align=center| 1
| align=center| 0:13
| Phoenix, Arizona, United States
| 
|-
|  NC
| align=center| 10–6 (1)
| Top Chynaimen
| NC (illegal punches)
| Extreme Shoot out
| 
| align=center| 1
| align=center| N/A
| McAllen, Texas, United States
| 
|-
| Win
| align=center| 10–6
| Henry Cho
| Submission (rear-naked choke)
| Neutral Grounds 12
| 
| align=center| 1
| align=center| N/A
| align=center| N/A
| No location given
|-
| Win
| align=center| 9–6
| David Harris
| Submission (rear-naked choke)
| Arizona Shootfighting Association
| 
| align=center| 1
| align=center| 1:01
| Phoenix, Arizona, United States
| 
|-
| Win
| align=center| 8–6
| James Minson
| DQ
| Extreme Shoot out
| 
| align=center| 1
| align=center| N/A
| Mission, Texas, United States
| 
|-
| Win
| align=center| 7–6
| David Finn
| Submission (rear-naked choke)
| Extreme Shoot out
| 
| align=center| 1
| align=center| 2:18
| Mission, Texas, United States
| 
|-
| Win
| align=center| 6–6
| Vincent Ellis
| KO (punches)
| World Shoot Wrestling 3
| 
| align=center| 1
| align=center| N/A
| Pasadena, Texas, United States
| 
|-
| Win
| align=center| 5–6
| Gabriel Hernandez
| Submission (heel hook)
| World Shoot Wrestling 3
| 
| align=center| 1
| align=center| N/A
| Pasadena, Texas, United States
| 
|-
| Loss
| align=center| 4–6
| Kevin Cook
| Submission (choke)
| World Extreme Fighting 5
| 
| align=center| 1
| align=center| 2:50
| United States
| 
|-
| Loss
| align=center| 4–5
| Ben Earwood
| Submission (heel hook)
| Super Brawl 11
| 
| align=center| 1
| align=center| 1:54
| Honolulu, Hawaii, United States
| 
|-
| Win
| align=center| 4–4
| Brennan Kamaka
| Submission (guillotine choke)
| Super Brawl 11
| 
| align=center| 1
| align=center| 0:59
| Honolulu, Hawaii, United States
|
|-
| Loss
| align=center| 3–4
| Justin Martin
| Submission (ankle lock)
| Power Ring Warriors
| 
| align=center| 1
| align=center| 1:40
| Humble, Texas, United States
| 
|-
| Loss
| align=center| 3–3
| Dennis Hallman
| Submission (punches)
| Extreme Challenge 21
| 
| align=center| 1
| align=center| 0:44
| Hayward, Wisconsin, United States
| 
|-
| Loss
| align=center| 3–2
| Tom Schmitz
| Submission (armbar)
| Extreme Challenge 21
| 
| align=center| 1
| align=center| 0:25
| Hayward, Wisconsin, United States
| 
|-
| Win
| align=center| 3–1
| Michael Buell
| Submission (rear-naked choke)
| Super Brawl 9
| 
| align=center| 1
| align=center| 2:23
| El Paso, Texas, United States
| 
|-
| Loss
| align=center| 2–1
| Victor Hunsaker
| Submission (heel hook)
| Super Brawl 8
| 
| align=center| 1
| align=center| 0:36
| Honolulu, Hawaii, United States
| 
|-
| Win
| align=center| 2–0
| Tim Horton
| KO (punches)
| World Shoot Wrestling 2
| 
| align=center| 2
| align=center| 1:23
| Houston, Texas, United States
| 
|-
| Win
| align=center| 1–0
| Ramone Monserrate
| Submission (guillotine choke)
| World Shoot Wrestling
| 
| align=center| 1
| align=center| 9:08
| Pasadena, Texas, United States
|

References

External links

 

1970 births
American male mixed martial artists
Living people
American practitioners of Brazilian jiu-jitsu
People awarded a black belt in Brazilian jiu-jitsu
American male karateka
American male kickboxers
American Lethwei practitioners
Kickboxers from Arizona
Middleweight kickboxers
Arizona State University alumni
Bare-knuckle boxers
Welterweight mixed martial artists
People from Coolidge, Arizona
Heavyweight mixed martial artists
Mixed martial artists utilizing Lethwei
Mixed martial artists utilizing boxing
Mixed martial artists utilizing karate
Mixed martial artists utilizing wrestling
Mixed martial artists utilizing Brazilian jiu-jitsu
United States Army soldiers
Bodyguards
American male sport wrestlers
Native American sportspeople
Sportspeople from the Phoenix metropolitan area